"Cold Day in July" is a country music song written by Richard Leigh.

Two artists recorded the song in 1992, Suzy Bogguss on her album Voices in the Wind and Joy Lynn White on her debut album, Between Midnight & Hindsight. White's version was released as a single in 1993, peaking at #71 on the Billboard Hot Country Singles & Tracks chart.

"Cold Day in July" was recorded by American country music group Dixie Chicks on their 1999 album, Fly. Released in May 2000 as the album's fourth single, the Dixie Chicks' version peaked at #10 on the Billboard Hot Country Singles & Tracks chart in July 2000. It also reached #7 on the RPM Country Tracks chart in Canada.

Chart performance

Joy Lynn White

Dixie Chicks

Year-end charts

References

1993 singles
2000 singles
Suzy Bogguss songs
Joy Lynn White songs
The Chicks songs
Songs written by Richard Leigh (songwriter)
Song recordings produced by Paul Worley
Monument Records singles
Epic Records singles
Song recordings produced by Blake Chancey
1992 songs